The Motorway D3 (formerly D18), sometimes called the Kysuce Motorway, is a motorway in northern Slovakia. Initially, it is supposed to be only a two lane motorway in the Svrčinovec - Slovak/Polish border section, and four lane motorway in the remaining section Hričovské Podhradie - Čadca.
It lies on these E-roads: E50, E75 and E442.

It starts at the motorway junction with the D1, bypassing Žilina, then gqoes to the north around Kysucké Nové Mesto and Čadca, having an interchange with the R5, and ends near the village of Skalité, where it crosses the Polish border and connects to Expressway S1.This is one of the most important motorways in Slovakia and an e-vignette is required to use this motorway. The whole motorway has 2 lanes on each side.

Sections of the motorway
-

See also

 D3 motorway (Czech Republic)
 Horelica Tunnel
 Highways in Slovakia

External links
 Exits of Motorway D3
 Interactive map of motorways
 https://ww-w.ndsas.sk/narodna-dialnicna-spolocnost

Highways in Slovakia